Brunnbäck is a small community in Sweden, eight kilometers southeast of Avesta in Dalarna at a crossing of Dalälven.

In 1521, at the Battle of Brunnbäck Ferry, Swedish rebel troops under Peder Svensson and Olof Bonde defeated a Danish host by encirclement, cementing the Swedish Rebellion and allowing Gustav Vasa sufficient time to raise an army to challenge the Danish king.

References

Populated places in Dalarna County